Willow Springs is a city in Howell County, Missouri, in the Ozark Mountains of the United States. The population was 2,184 at the 2010 census.

History 
Willow Springs was so named from its position at the site of a spring, surrounded by willows.

Geography
Willow Springs is located at  (36.991164, -91.967360).

The community is located on Route 137, east of concurrent U.S. Routes 60 and 63.

Demographics

2010 census
As of the census of 2010, there were 2,184 people, 925 households, and 564 families living in the city. The racial makeup of the city was 96.11% White, 0.14% Black or African American, 0.41% Native American, 0.73% Asian, 0.46% from other races, and 2.15% from two or more races. Hispanic or Latino of any race were 2.06% of the population.

There were 925 households, of which 31.5% had children under the age of 18 living with them, 42.3% were married couples living together, 13.7% had a female householder with no husband present, 5.0% had a male householder with no wife present, and 39.0% were non-families. 35.1% of all households were made up of individuals, and 18.3% had someone living alone who was 65 years of age or older. The average household size was 2.36 and the average family size was 2.94.

The median age in the city was 38.6 years. 26.6% of residents were under the age of 18; 8.1% were between the ages of 18 and 24; 23.2% were from 25 to 44; 21.1% were from 45 to 64; and 21.1% were 65 years of age or older. The gender makeup of the city was 47.1% male and 52.9% female.

2000 census
As of the census of 2000, there were 2,147 people, 913 households, and 545 families living in the city. The population density was 654.9 people per square mile (252.7/km). There were 1,033 housing units at an average density of 315.1 per square mile (121.6/km). The racial makeup of the city was 97.02% White, 0.37% African American, 0.84% Native American, 0.28% Asian, and 1.49% from two or more races. Hispanic or Latino of any race were 1.07% of the population.

There were 913 households, out of which 27.6% had children under the age of 18 living with them, 46.8% were married couples living together, 10.5% had a female householder with no husband present, and 40.3% were non-families. 36.0% of all households were made up of individuals, and 22.3% had someone living alone who was 65 years of age or older. The average household size was 2.21 and the average family size was 2.89.

In the city the population was spread out, with 23.5% under the age of 18, 7.7% from 18 to 24, 22.6% from 25 to 44, 19.2% from 45 to 64, and 27.0% who were 65 years of age or older. The median age was 42 years. For every 100 females, there were 82.6 males. For every 100 females age 18 and over, there were 73.3 males.

The median income for a household in the city was $19,894, and the median income for a family was $25,917. Males had a median income of $22,357 versus $16,316 for females. The per capita income for the city was $13,681. About 20.8% of families and 26.0% of the population were below the poverty line, including 41.4% of those under age 18 and 17.0% of those age 65 or over.

Education
Public education in Willow Springs is administered by Willow Springs R-IV School District.

Willow Springs has a lending library, the Willow Springs Public Library.

Notable people
Bob Ferguson, RCA Record Producer and Songwriter, known famously for his song "On the Wings of a Dove" that was recorded first by Ferlin Husky in the early 1960s. He was born in Willow Springs in 1927.
Rowe Findley, National Geographic writer and editor, was born and raised in Willow Springs.

References

External links

 Official site
 Willow Springs Chamber of Commerce
 Willow Springs R-IV School District
 Historic maps of Willow Springs in the Sanborn Maps of Missouri Collection at the University of Missouri

Cities in Howell County, Missouri
Cities in Missouri